The MB.200 was a French bomber aircraft of the 1930s designed and built by Societé des Avions Marcel Bloch.  A twin-engined high-winged monoplane with a fixed undercarriage, over 200 MB.200s were built for the French Air Force, and the type was also licence built by Czechoslovakia, but it soon became obsolete, and was largely phased out by the start of the Second World War.

Development and design
The Bloch MB.200 was designed in response to a 1932 requirement for a new day/night bomber to equip the French Air Force. It was a high-winged all-metal cantilever monoplane, with a slab-sided fuselage, powered by two Gnome & Rhône 14Kirs radial engines. It had a fixed tailwheel undercarriage and featured an enclosed cockpit for the pilots. Defensive machine guns were in nose and dorsal gun turrets and an under fuselage gondola.

The first of three prototypes flew on 26 June 1933. As one of the winning designs for the competition, (the other was the larger Farman F.221), an initial order for 30 MB.200s was placed on 1 January 1934, entering service late in that year. Further orders followed, and the MB.200 equipped 12 French squadrons by the end of 1935. Production in France totalled over 208 aircraft (4 by Bloch, 19 by Breguet, 19 by Loire, 45 by Hanriot, 10 by SNCASO and 111 by Potez).

Operational history

Czechoslovakia chose the MB.200 as part of a modernisation program for its air force of the  mid-1930s.  Although at the rate of aircraft development at that time, the MB.200 would quickly become obsolete, the Czechoslovakians needed a quick solution involving the license production of a proven design, as their own aircraft industry did not have sufficient development experience with such a large aircraft, or with all-metal airframes and stressed-skin construction, placing an initial order for 74 aircraft. After some delays, both Aero and Avia began license-production in 1937, with  a total of about 124 built. Czechoslovakian MB.200s were basically similar to their French counterparts, with differences in defensive armament and other equipment.

The Spanish Republic acquired 2 units thirty days after the beginning of the Spanish Civil War. These units were sent to Barcelona. Later, 30 units more were sent by ship and assembled in Air France's workshop at Prat de Llobregat. A third of the whole airfleet were shot down during the first months of the conflict and the rest were limited to the defense of the republican east coast during the rest of the war serving under the Escuadra 7 and the Grupo 72 combined with other French bombers. None of the 32 planes survived the conflict.

The gradual German conquest of Czechoslovakia meant that MB.200s eventually passed under their control, including aircraft that were still coming off the production line. As well as serving in the German Luftwaffe, some bombers were distributed to Bulgaria.

Vichy France deployed a squadron of MB.200s against the Allied invasion of Lebanon and Syria in 1941, carrying out at least one daylight bombing mission against British shipping.

Variants
MB.200.01
single prototype –
MB.200B.4
main production version – 2x Gnome-Rhône 14Kirs
MB.201
two Hispano-Suiza 12Ybrs engines
MB.202
four Gnome-Rhône 7Kdrs engines
MB.203
two Clerget 14F diesel engines

Operators

 Bulgarian Air Force – Purchased 12 ex-Czech MB.200s from Germany in 1939, using them as trainers.
 Czechoslovak Air Force
 Armée de l'Air (from 1935)
 Luftwaffe (captured)
 Slovak Air Force (1 piece)
 Spain Spanish Republican Air Force received 30 units from France, at least one aircraft survived 1938 but none of them survived the war.

Specifications (MB.200B.4)

See also

Notes

Bibliography
 Angelucci, Enzo. World Encyclopedia of Military Aircraft. London, Jane's Publishing, 1981. .

 Green, William and Gordon Swanborough. "Balkan Interlude - The Bulgarian Air Force in WWII". Air Enthusiast. Issue 39, May–August 1989. Bromley, Kent: Tri-Service Press, pp. 58–74. .
 Shores, Christopher S. and Cristian-Jacques Ehrengardt. "Syrian Campaign, 1941: Part 1; Forestalling the Germans; air battles over S. Lebanon". Air Pictorial, July 1970. pp. 242–247.
 Shores, Christopher S. and Cristian-Jacques Ehrengardt. "Syrian Campaign, 1941: Part 2; Breaking the back of Vichy air strength; conclusion". Air Pictorial, August 1970. pp. 280–284.
 Taylor, Michael J.H. Warplanes of the World 1918–1939. London:Ian Allen, 1981. .
Abellán García-Muñoz, Juan "Galería de aviones de la Guerra civil española (1936–1939)". Instituto de Historia y Cultura aeronáuticas, Ministerio de Defensa 1996 pp. 80–81 .

External links

"Military Bloch aircraft : MB 200". Dassault Aviation. Retrieved 23 August 2008.

MB.200
1930s French bomber aircraft
High-wing aircraft
Aircraft first flown in 1933
Twin piston-engined tractor aircraft
Czechoslovakia–France relations